Bichura is the name of several rural localities in Russia:
Bichura, Amur Oblast, a selo in Dmitriyevsky Rural Settlement of Mazanovsky District in Amur Oblast
Bichura, Republic of Buryatia, a selo in Kirovsky Selsoviet of Bichursky District in the Republic of Buryatia